Jasminum angustifolium, the wild jasmine, is a species of jasmine native to India, Sri Lanka and the Andaman Islands. It is a climbing shrub with a smooth stem and minutely pubescent branchlets.

This flower, along with Jasminum grandiflorum, play a central role in Buddhist and Hindu temple floral offerings and garlands.

Etymology
'Jasminum' is a Latinized form of the Arabic word 'yasemin', for sweetly scented plants.

References

angustifolium
Flora of Sri Lanka
Flora of India (region)
Flora of the Andaman Islands
Plants described in 1753
Taxa named by Carl Linnaeus